The 2022 Fitzgibbon Cup was the 105th staging of the Fitzgibbon Cup since its establishment by the Gaelic Athletic Association in 1912. It is sponsored by Electric Ireland, and known as the Electric Ireland HE GAA Fitzgibbon Cup for sponsorship purposes. The draw for the group stage fixtures took place on 14 December 2020. The 2022 Fitzgibbon Cup started with the group stage on 19 January 2022 and ended on 19 February 2022.

University College Cork were the defending champions, however, they were beaten by Institute of Technology, Carlow at the quarter-final stage.

The final was played on 19 February 2022 at the Institute of Technology, Carlow, between the University of Limerick and NUI Galway, in what was their first ever meeting in a final. The University of Limerick won the match by 1–21 to 2–15 to claim their seventh Fitzgibbon Cup title overall and a first title since 2018.

NUI Galway's Evan Niland was the top scorer with 0-79.

Group stage

Group A

Group A table

Group A fixtures and results

Group B

Group B table

Group B fixtures and results

Group C

Group C table

Group C fixtures and results

Group D

Group D table

Group D fixtures and results

Knockout stage

Quarter-finals

Semi-finals

Final

Statistics

Top scorers

Overall

In a single game

References

External links
 Higher Education fixtures and results

Fitzgibbon
Fitzgibbon Cup